Tziporah Atarah Malkah (born Katherine Helen Fischer; 30 November 1973) is an Australian former model and actress.

Early life and career 
Kate Fischer was born on 30 November 1973 in Adelaide, South Australia, the daughter of future Australian politician Pru Goward and university lecturer Alastair Fischer. She is the eldest of three daughters. She attended the Canberra Girls' Grammar School before going to Narrabundah College.

In 1987, at the age of 13, Malkah won the Dolly Covergirl of the Year competition and was touted as the next Elle Macpherson. By the early 1990s, she had become a high-profile model working in Sydney and New York. She did shoots for Bloomingdales, Glamor magazine and Mademoiselle, and was featured on the covers of Black + White magazine and Vogue Australia. In 2005–2006, Malkah was the face of AMP Capital Shopping Centres in Australia.

In 1993, Malkah had a role in the Australian film Sirens, playing alongside Elle Macpherson, Portia de Rossi, Sam Neill and Hugh Grant as one of the three life models of painter Norman Lindsay. In 1995, Malkah was recruited for an ongoing role in the Network 10 TV soap opera Echo Point which aired for six months. She appeared in several of the Elle McFeast (Libbi Gorr) comedy specials on ABC TV such as Breasts (1996) and The Whitlam Dismissal (1996).

For two years (1996–1997), Malkah was the host of the Looney Tunes cartoon show What's Up Doc? on the Nine Network. In 1997, she had a small part in the Australian film Dust Off the Wings, a drama set amidst Sydney's surfing culture. In 2000, she starred in the horror film Blood Surf, filmed in South Africa.

Malkah starred as a blind girl who is courted by a struggling comedian in the Australian film comedy The Real Thing (2002) and had a small role as a CIA agent in the Steven Seagal direct-to-video action film The Foreigner (2003). In 2002, she appeared in three episodes of the Channel 7 medical drama series All Saints.

In 2005, Malkah resurfaced on the Nine Network's Celebrity Overhaul, a show in which celebrities try to regain their fitness through good diet and exercise habits.

In 2006, Malkah appeared as a guest judge on the Special Broadcasting Service (SBS) program Song For The Socceroos and as a contestant on the Seven Network TV show It Takes Two. The same year, she also made a guest appearance on the first series of The Chaser's War on Everything on ABC TV and also became the host of the short-lived weekly clip show Top 40 Celebrity Countdown on the Seven Network.

In 2007, she filmed a short comedy video, Supermodel Hotdog, which aired on YouTube. The sketch, filmed at her LA apartment, self-satirised her popular image as a celebrity and movie star.

In January 2017, Malkah (having legally changed her name several years earlier) became a contestant on the Australian version of I'm a Celebrity...Get Me Out of Here!  She was evicted by a public vote on day 31 after spending 30 days in the African jungle. Following her departure, she made news headlines after some awkward post-eviction interviews.

Personal life
She was engaged to businessman James Packer until the couple separated in 1998 after five years together and a two-year engagement. Their breakup received wide coverage in both the mainstream and tabloid press, fueled by rumours regarding the extent of the financial settlement. Malkah later stated she received "a few hundred thousand dollars" and the house they had formerly shared. She eventually sold the house for A$2,825,000 in 2000. Since 1998, Malkah has spent much of her time living in the United States. While there, she converted to Judaism and changed her name to Tziporah Atarah Malkah.

According to the Sydney Morning Herald in 2010, Malkah described herself as a political conservative and a supporter of the US Republican Party and the Australian Liberal Party.

After returning to Australia in 2011, she resided at a boarding house for 22 months due to reduced circumstances.

In 2016, it was reported that Malkah was living in Toorak, Victoria, and employed as an aged care worker.

Film and TV roles
Sirens (film), 1993
Full Moon, Dirty Hearts by INXS (music video), 1993
Echo Point (TV series), 1995 (ongoing role)
What's Up Doc? (Australian TV series), 1996–1997 (host)
Elle McFeast Special: Breasts (TV special)- 1996 (guest appearance)
Elle McFeast Special: The Whitlam Dismissal (TV special), 1996 (guest appearance)
Twisted Tales (TV series), 1996 (1 episode)
The Munsters Scary Little Christmas (TV movie), 1996
Dust Off the Wings (film), 1997
Pigeon (film), 1998
Murder Call (TV series), 1998 (1 episode)
Blood Surf (film), 2000
All Saints (TV series), 2002 (3 episodes)
The Real Thing (film), 2002
The Foreigner (film), 2003
Celebrity Overhaul (TV series), 2005
The Chaser's War on Everything (TV series), 2006 (guest appearance)
Top 40 Celebrity Countdown (TV), 2006 (host)
I'm a Celebrity... Get Me Out of Here!, 2017

Cultural references
In 1997, "Kate and Barbie", a portrait of Malkah by Australian painter Paul Newton was a finalist in the annual Archibald Prize exhibition and is now in her private art collection. Newton also painted another portrait of Malkah the same year titled "Homage to Madame X", now owned by her mother, Pru Goward. David Bromley painted her portrait in 2001.

References

External links
Official website at Archive.org
Profile on the Rotten Tomatoes website

1973 births
Living people
Australian Jews
Australian film actresses
American female models
Actresses from Adelaide
Converts to Judaism
Australian expatriate actresses in the United States
Australian female models
Australian television actresses
People with acquired American citizenship
I'm a Celebrity...Get Me Out of Here! (Australian TV series) participants
21st-century American women